The GAZ M21 Volga is an automobile produced in the Soviet Union by GAZ (Gorkovsky Avtomobilniy Zavod, in English "Gorky automobile factory") from 1956 to 1970. The first car to carry the Volga name, it was developed in the early 1950s. Volgas were built with high ground clearance (which gives it a specific "high" look, contrary to "low-long-sleek" look of Western cars of similar design), rugged suspension, strong and forgiving engine, and rustproofing on a scale unheard of in the 1950s.

The Volga was stylistically in line with the major American manufacturers of the period in which it was introduced, and incorporated such then-luxury features as the reclining front seat, cigarette lighter, heater, windshield washer and three-wave radio.

When in 1959 the six-cylinder line of GAZ cars was discontinued, GAZ M-21 Volga became the biggest and most luxurious car officially sold to individual owners in the USSR in large quantities; though its  very high price made it unavailable for most car buyers, 639,478 cars were produced in total.

The three series of GAZ-21 
Three series GAZ-21 were released, most easily distinguished by the grille. The first series (1956–58), known as the Star, featured a lattice of three large horizontal bars in the centre of which was a medallion with a star. Vehicles of the second series (1958–1962), known as the Shark, featured a grille with 16 vertical slits. Finally, the third series (1962–1970), known as the Baleen, featured a grille with 34 thin vertical rods.

First series 1956–1958
The design process leading to the GAZ-21 began in November 1953. Alexander Nevzorov, head of the design team, was given a free hand to develop whatever he wanted to reach the objective of competing with American automobiles. Designer Lev Eremeyev decided to follow the fashion set by the Chevrolet Bel Air, Plymouth Savoy, and Ford Mainline; the finished product bears a resemblance to the 1955 Mainline, although according to archive documents, the latter was purchased for comparison and on-road testing by GAZ only in mid-1954, after the first prototypes of the GAZ-21 had already been built and tested. The prototype appeared in the first quarter of 1954, powered by an inline four with overhead camshaft (driven by chain) and cross-flow hemispherical head. Since the OHV engine was not ready in time, production M21s had a   sidevalve four, based on the GAZ-20's. The Volga was offered with a three-speed transmission, either manual (with synchronized second and third gears) or automatic. Front suspension was independent, while the rear was a live axle with semielliptical springs;  lever shock absorbers were on all four corners. Lubrication was by a central oiling system, from a drum and foot-operated pump; the oil lines were prone to puncturing, and not all of the 19 lubricated points were supplied equally. The Volga offered front seats able to fold flat (not unlike a contemporary Nash option) and came standard with cigarette lighter and a radio (still optional on most U.S. cars). The three variants were the standard M21G, an M21B taxi (with a taximeter in place of the radio and bucket seats in front instead of a bench), and a tropical model, the M21GYU, all with the GAZ leaping deer hood ornament. Drag coefficient was a surprisingly good 0.42. The only thing that the Volga and Mainline had in common was the Ford-O-Matic transmission, which the GAZ plant liecensed for use in their vehicles.

The Volga made its public debut in 1955, with a three cars on a demonstration drive from Moscow to the Crimea, two automatic models and a manual. It was, however, still far from production-ready; in the first year, 1956, only five cars were assembled, the first on 10 October 1956. Full-scale production began in 1957, with a list price of 5,400 rubles. The new 1957 production cars, known as Series Ones, had a brand-new  OHV engine, the first model produced by Zavolzhskiy Motorniy Zavod (Zavolzhye Engine Factory, ZMZ).

The automatic transmission model was soon discontinued, with only 700 built: it was widely criticized as being too difficult for Soviet drivers to maintain, few service stations were available to do the work and few private mechanics were qualified, and a shortage of transmission oil existed. From 1958, a three-speed manual, with synchromesh on the top two gears, was the only transmission available; this was the M21V, while the taxi became the M21A. The automatic did go on to be used in the low-production GAZ-13 Chaika, which was also maintained by professionals. Standard equipment on all models included spare parts and two tool kits, with spanners, wrenches, screwdrivers, a tire pump, and a can of paint to fix minor dings.

Also, export models were built,  M21D with the manual transmission and M21E with the automatic, both with a higher 7.2:1 compression engine, producing .

Cars produced in the fall of 1958 combined features of the first and second series.

Second series 1959–1962 
Second-series Volgas were introduced in 1959, with a new grille painted the body color or in chrome. Halfway through the 1959 production run (model year 1959), a vinyl cover was added to the dash. Added were windscreen washers and tubeless tires. Just before the second-series production concluded, telescopic shocks replaced the lever type. The 1961 Volgas were priced at 5,100 rubles.

Variants of this series included the M21I and M21A taxi with the  inline four, and the M21K and right-hand drive M21H (for export) with the  engine.

The Volga was shown at the 1958 Brussels World's Fair and together with the GAZ-52 truck and the GAZ-13 Chaika, it won the award. In the same year, production for export began. The second-series Volgas became known for having no frills, but outstanding durability, helped by the  ground clearance. In 1959, a Volga took a class win at the Thousand Lakes Rally in Finland, and third at the Acropolis Rally. That year, the central lubrication system was deleted, in favor of a more traditional local grease-application nipple.

In early 1962, a small number of cars were built that combined features of the second and third series.

Third series 1962–1970
The third series was produced from 1962 to 1970. The 1962 models dropped the leaping-deer hood ornament, and had a new grille. The headliner changed from cloth to vinyl, and the radio became optional. It was offered as the standard M21L, M21T taxi, and right-hand drive M21N export model.

Also in 1962, GAZ advertised a station wagon/estate model, the M22; most of these were exported or reserved for official use. The first station wagons/estates were delivered in 1963, and were designated M22, M22G (export), M22T (export); ambulances were M22B and M22BK. An M22 prototype four-wheel drive station wagon/estate was also built, as was an M22A van.

Belgian importer Sobimpex N.V. assembled Volgas locally for sale in Western Europe. These were often fitted with diesel engines; the cars arrived in Antwerp without an engine and with the gearbox in the trunk. Originally (beginning in 1960) Sobimpex fitted a 1.6-liter Perkins 4.99 unit, a larger Rover engine supplanted that in 1963, and the more modern  four-cylinder units replaced the Rover engine in 1964. Belgian-built cars were marketed as "Scaldia-Volgas", named after the Latin name for the river Scheldt. While the diesel models cost considerably more than ones with the original engine, they were quite popular for their economy and reliability, and outsold the petrol models in both Belgium and the Netherlands.

Models
The car's large size and tough construction made it popular in the police and taxi trades, and V8-powered versions (designated GAZ M23) were produced for the KGB. An automatic transmission was briefly offered in the late 1950s, but later discontinued due to lack of service stations, and then through the 1960s on the KGB's V8 version only, with the driver's controls being very similar to the discontinued "civil" automatic.

The M21 Volga was produced in saloon form from 1956 to 1970 and station wagon form (GAZ M22 Universal) from 1962 to 1970. This left the design quite outdated by the 1960s. GAZ developed a boxier, more modern replacement, and in 1970, the M21 platform was discontinued by GAZ. Until the late 1970s, however, spare parts were produced by different plants all over the USSR, and some plants were rebuilding M21s using spare parts, wrecked, and junked cars. In 1988, about 80,000 M21 Volgas were registered in the USSR.

The Deluxe variant has additional chrome trim around the windows and spanning the front and rear headlights, with the rear ones being fin-shaped. They also usually included the 79 hp engines instead of the standard 69 hp ones.

One M21 was given to Yuri Gagarin after his orbital flight; Gagarin was very fond of his Volga.

The UAZ-469 all-terrain vehicle uses a GAZ-21A engine, and the RAF-977 minibus used the GAZ-21 engine and drivetrain.

A special-variant GAZ-23 Volga was produced for Soviet special services only, with  5.53-litre V8 engine from the Chaika. These were also equipped with the Chaika's automatic transmission. This allowed the M23 to reach . Only 603 of the M23s were built between 1962 and 1970.

Gallery

Popular culture 
 A GAZ-21 is the main car featured in Rammstein's music video for the song "Du hast".
 In the Soviet cult movie Beware of the Car, the protagonist, Yuriy Detochkin, steals Volga cars from corrupt officials.
 The protagonist of the 2009 Russian superhero movie Black Lightning fights crime with his flying car, a black 1966 GAZ-21.
 The car is featured in the mobile game, Retro Garage, which features many other vehicles produced in the Soviet-Era, as well as some based on German vehicles.
One of the possible models for the "Black Volga" urban legend is the GAZ-21.

References

External links 

 https://drives.today/articles/263/retro/1969-gaz-m-21-volga/glen-waddington.html
 http://www.retro-volga.ru
 http://www.gaz21.com
 http://www.volga.nl
 http://www.gaz21.fi

Cars of Russia
Cars introduced in 1956
1960s cars
1970s cars
Rear-wheel-drive vehicles
Sedans
Executive cars
GAZ Volga
Station wagons
Soviet automobiles
Soviet brands